Trupanea vulpina is a species of tephritid or fruit flies in the genus Tephritomyia of the family Tephritidae.

Distribution
Trupanea vulpina is native to the country of Chile.

References

Tephritinae
Insects described in 1942
Diptera of South America
Endemic fauna of Chile